Shahabuddin Degree College is a higher education institution located in Fulbaria, Mymensingh, Bangladesh established in 1987. It belongs to Bangladesh National University.

History 
This college was established in 1987. Politicians Maulvi Shahabuddin Ahmed established the college in The Assim, Fulbaria of Mymensingh district.

Then The MP Habib Ullah Sarkar made a special contribution to the mpo of the college.

From the academic year 2004–05, the Business Management (BM) branch was started in the college. The college was upgraded to a degree level from the academic year 2009–10.

In 2015, the present member of parliament Moslem Uddin established an HSC examination centre in the college.

description 
The college is named after its founder Maulvi Shahabuddin Ahmed.

Infrastructure 
At present, Shahabuddin Degree College has a total of two education buildings, a mosque and a food house.

Degrees 
The college gives degree in the following subjects:

BSS 
 Political science
 Sociology
 History

Graduate Class 
 Bengali
 General English
 History

Higher Secondary 
 Science
 Human
 Business education
 Business management (BM)

Gallery

See also 
 Begum Fazilatunnecha Mujib Government Mohila College
 Shamsuddin Ahmed (engineer)

References

External links

1987 establishments in Bangladesh
Colleges in Mymensingh District
Educational institutions established in 1987
Universities and colleges in Mymensingh District